Serafino Ramazzotti (1846 - 1920) was an Italian painter.

Biography
He was born in Sozzago in the province of Novara, and studied in the Albertina Academy of Fine Arts in Turin, where he first trained with the painter Among his works are La povera fioraia; Lo spirito di libertà; Il ritorno dal campo; Psiche; Giacomino; Luciella; La paura del bambino; Flirtation ; and Mia suocera. He has also exhibited a number of terracotta statues. In the acts of the Academy of Fine Arts of Milan in 1893, he is listed as an associate member, as a sculptor active in Padua.

References

1846 births
1920 deaths
19th-century Italian painters
Italian male painters
20th-century Italian painters
19th-century Italian sculptors
Italian male sculptors
20th-century Italian sculptors
20th-century Italian male artists
Painters from Piedmont
Accademia Albertina alumni
19th-century Italian male artists